Franklin T. Lambert is a professor of history at Purdue University. He received his PhD from Northwestern University in 1990 and has special interests in American Colonial and Revolutionary Era history. Before earning his PhD he was also a punter for the Pittsburgh Steelers from 1965 to 1966.

Bibliography

Books

Book chapters and journal articles

Encyclopedia articles
The Great Awakening, in Encyclopedia of the Enlightenment, 4 vols. Oxford University Press, 2003. ed. by Alan Charles Kors.

Further reading

References

Historians of the American Revolution
Living people
21st-century American historians
21st-century American male writers
Purdue University faculty
Northwestern University alumni
Year of birth missing (living people)
American male non-fiction writers